Fernando David Saucedo (born 13 January 1981) commonly known as David Saucedo is an Argentine professional boxer. His father was also a boxer and is now his coach.

Professional career
On December 5, 2010 Saucedo had his chance for WBA (Super) featherweight title against Chris John. But he was defeated by Unanimous Decision after 12 rounds.

On October 4, 2014 Saucedo was defeated by Unanimous Decision after 12 rounds against unbeaten Rances Barthelemy in his first defense of IBF super featherweight title.

On January 27, 2018 Ghana’s Emmanuel Tagoe (28-1, 14 KOs) controversially stopped Fernando David Saucedo (61-7-3, 10 KOs) in round 10 to defend his IBO lightweight belt at the Bukom Boxing Arena in Accra, Ghana.

Professional boxing record 

|-
|align="center" colspan=8|61 Wins (10 knockouts), 7 Losses (0 knockouts), 3 Draw
|- 
!Res.
!Record
!Opponent
!Type
!RoundTime
!Date
!Location
!Notes
|-
|Loss||62–7–3||align=left| Emmanuel Tagoe
|
|
|
|align=left|
|align=left|
|- 
|- 
|Win||61–6–3||align=left| Ramon Elizer Esperanza
|
|
|
|align=left|
|align=left|
|- 
|- 
|Win||60–6–3||align=left| Pablo Manuel Ojeda
|
|
|
|align=left|
|align=left|
|- 
|- 
|Win||59–6–3||align=left| Diego Alberto Chaves
|
|
|
|align=left|
|align=left|
|- 
|- 
|Win||58–6–3||align=left| Jorge Luis Rodriguez
|
|
|
|align=left|
|align=left|
|- 
|Win||57–6–3||align=left| Carlos Fulgencio
|
|
|
|align=left|
|align=left|
|- 
|Win||56–6–3||align=left| Leandro Mendes Pinto
|
|
|
|align=left|
|align=left|
|- 
|Win||55–6–3||align=left| Juan Jose Farias
|
|
|
|align=left|
|align=left|
|- 
|Win||54–6–3||align=left| Leandro Mendes Pinto
|
|
|
|align=left|
|align=left|
|- 
|Win||53–6–3||align=left| Sergio Mauricio Gil
|
|
|
|align=left|
|align=left|
|- 
|Loss||52–6–3||align=left| Rances Barthelemy
|
|
|
|align=left|
|align=left|
|- 
|Win||52–5–3||align=left| Luis Armando Juarez
|
|
|
|align=left|
|align=left|
|- 
|Win||51–5–3||align=left| John Carlo Aparicio
|
|
|
|align=left|
|align=left|
|- 
|Win||50–5–3||align=left| Sergio Manuel Medina
|
|
|
|align=left|
|align=left|
|- 
|Win||49–5–3||align=left| Isaias Santos Sampaio
|
|
|
|align=left|
|align=left|
|- 
|Win||48–5–3||align=left| Edilson Rio
|
|
|
|align=left|
|align=left|
|- 
|Win||47–5–3||align=left| Cristian Palma
|
|
|
|align=left|
|align=left|
|- 
|Win||46–5–3||align=left| Luis Armando Juarez
|
|
|
|align=left|
|align=left|
|- 
|Win||45–5–3||align=left| Sergio Alejandro Blanco
|
|
|
|align=left|
|align=left|
|- 
|Win||44–5–3||align=left| Sergio Javier Escobar
|
|
|
|align=left|
|align=left|
|- 
|Win||43–5–3||align=left| Diego Ramon Acosta
|
|
|
|align=left|
|align=left|
|- 
|Win||42–5–3||align=left| Carlos Rodriguez
|
|
|
|align=left|
|align=left|
|- 
|Win||41–5–3||align=left| Cid Edson Bispo Ribeiro
|
|
|
|align=left|
|align=left|
|- 
|Win||40–5–3||align=left| Sergio Daniel Ledesma
|
|
|
|align=left|
|align=left|
|- 
|Win||39–5–3||align=left| Ricardo Chamorro
|
|
|
|align=left|
|align=left|
|- 
|Loss||38–5–3||align=left| Chris John
|
|
|
|align=left|
|align=left|
|- 
|Win||38–4–3||align=left| Jorge Martin Garcia
|
|
|
|align=left|
|align=left|
|- 
|Win||37–4–3||align=left| Miguel Caceres
|
|
|
|align=left|
|align=left|
|- 
|Win||36–4–3||align=left| Miguel Caceres
|
|
|
|align=left|
|align=left|
|- 
|Win||35–4–3||align=left| Diego Ramon Acosta
|
|
|
|align=left|
|align=left|
|- 
|Win||34–4–3||align=left| Diego Ramon Acosta
|
|
|
|align=left|
|align=left|
|- 
|Win||33–4–3||align=left| Leandro Almagro
|
|
|
|align=left|
|align=left|
|- 
|Win||32–4–3||align=left| Cristian Javier Olmedo
|
|
|
|align=left|
|align=left|
|- 
|Win||31–4–3||align=left| Sergio Daniel Ledesma
|
|
|
|align=left|
|align=left|
|- 
|Win||30–4–3||align=left| Claudio Rosendo Tapia
|
|
|
|align=left|
|align=left|
|- 
|Win||29–4–3||align=left| Marcelo Antonio Gomez
|
|
|
|align=left|
|align=left|
|- 
|Win||28–4–3||align=left| Claudio Rosendo Tapia
|
|
|
|align=left|
|align=left|
|- 
|Win||27–4–3||align=left| Sergio Daniel Ledesma
|
|
|
|align=left|
|align=left|
|- 
|Win||26–4–3||align=left| Hardy Paredes
|
|
|
|align=left|
|align=left|
|- 
|Win||25–4–3||align=left| Dante Fabian Tablada
|
|
|
|align=left|
|align=left|
|- 
|Win||24–4–3||align=left| Alejandro Daniel Gomez
|
|
|
|align=left|
|align=left|
|- 
|Win||23–4–3||align=left| Diego Martin Alzugaray
|
|
|
|align=left|
|align=left|
|- 
|Win||22–4–3||align=left| Sergio Gonzalez
|
|
|
|align=left|
|align=left|
|- 
|Draw||21–4–3||align=left| Alejandro Daniel Gomez
|
|
|
|align=left|
|align=left|
|- 
|Win||21–4–2||align=left| Ricardo Chamorro
|
|
|
|align=left|
|align=left|
|- 
|Win||20–4–2||align=left| Hernan Valenzuela
|
|
|
|align=left|
|align=left|
|- 
|Win||19–4–2||align=left| Julio Gonzalez
|
|
|
|align=left|
|align=left|
|- 
|Win||18–4–2||align=left| Fabian Martinez
|
|
|
|align=left|
|align=left|
|- 
|Win||17–4–2||align=left| Jesus Ceferino Vergara
|
|
|
|align=left|
|align=left|
|- 
|Loss||16–4–2||align=left| Acelino Freitas
|
|
|
|align=left|
|align=left|
|- 
|Win||16–3–2||align=left| Vicente Luis Burgo
|
|
|
|align=left|
|align=left|
|- 
|Win||15–3–2||align=left| Miguel Angel Albarado
|
|
|
|align=left|
|align=left|
|- 
|Loss||14–3–2||align=left| Nedal Hussein
|
|
|
|align=left|
|align=left|
|- 
|Win||14–2–2||align=left| Julio Cesar Alganaraz
|
|
|
|align=left|
|align=left|
|- 
|Loss||13–2–2||align=left| Claudio Rosendo Tapia
|
|
|
|align=left|
|align=left|
|- 
|Win||13–1–2||align=left| Ricardo Ariel Elias
|
|
|
|align=left|
|align=left|
|- 
|Draw||12–1–2||align=left| Fabian Martinez
|
|
|
|align=left|
|align=left|
|-
|Win||12–1–1||align=left| Julio Gonzalez
|
|
|
|align=left|
|align=left|
|-
|}

References

1981 births
Living people
Sportspeople from Buenos Aires Province
Argentine male boxers
Featherweight boxers